The sixteenth season of Unsolved Mysteries is billed as the third volume of a Netflix reboot revival of the long-running American television series, created by John Cosgrove and Terry Dunn Meurer. The show, which documents and seeks to solve cold cases and paranormal phenomena, originally ran from 1987–2010.

Like the previous season released by Netflix, there is no host or narrator. However, an image of longtime host Robert Stack is shown in the title sequence of each episode.

Background
On September 6, 2022, Netflix announced that a new season, serving as the third volume of their reboot of the series, would consist of nine new episodes, and that it would release in small batches of three episodes every week as a billed "three-night event". These batches would begin streaming on October 18, October 25, and November 1, 2022.

Episodes

References

External links
 
 
 

2020 American television seasons
Lists of American non-fiction television series episodes
Lists of mystery television series episodes